The Immediate Geographic Region of Muriaé is one of the 10 immediate geographic regions in the Intermediate Geographic Region of Juiz de Fora, one of the 70 immediate geographic regions in the Brazilian state of Minas Gerais and one of the 509 of Brazil, created by the National Institute of Geography and Statistics (IBGE) in 2017.

Municipalities 
It comprises 12 municipalities.

 Antônio Prado de Minas    
 Barão de Monte Alto        
 Eugenópolis      
 Fervedouro    
 Miradouro      
 Miraí      
 Muriaé      
 Patrocínio do Muriaé   
 Rosário da Limeira     
 São Francisco do Glória     
 São Sebastião da Vargem Alegre      
 Vieiras

References 

Geography of Minas Gerais